"Perfect Girl" is the second single from Kim Wilde's comeback album Never Say Never, released in 2006. The album contains new songs (including this one) as well as re-recorded versions of some of Wilde's 1980s hits.

Released in Germany, the single contained the "Radio Edit" of the song, but also two remixes. It also contained a new acoustic version of "European Soul" from Wilde's 1988 best-selling album Close.

CD-single formats
1. Perfect Girl (Radio Edit)
2. European Soul (Acoustic Version)

1. Perfect Girl (Radio Edit)
2. Perfect Girl (Perfect Chill mix)
3. Perfect Girl (Ian Finch Elektrika mix)
4. European Soul (Acoustic Version)

Kim Wilde songs
2006 songs
Songs written by Ricky Wilde
Songs written by Jörn-Uwe Fahrenkrog-Petersen